Ängsholmen may refer to:

 Ängsholmen, Eskilstuna Municipality, a place in Eskilstuna Municipality, Södermanland County, Sweden
 Ängsholmen, Lidingö, an island of the Fjäderholmarna group in Lidingö Municipality, Stockholm County, Sweden
 , an island to the north-east of Vindö in Värmdö Municipality, Stockholm County, Sweden
 , an island to the north-west of Vindö in Värmdö Municipality, Stockholm County, Sweden